Manuel Passos Fernandes (26 March 1922 in Machico – January 10, 1980), was Portuguese  footballer who played as defender.

International career 

Passos gained 17 caps for the Portugal national team and made his debut 23 November 1952 in Porto, in a 1-1 draw against Austria.

References

External links 
 

1922 births
1980 deaths
Portuguese footballers
Association football defenders
Primeira Liga players
Sporting CP footballers
Portugal international footballers
People from Machico, Madeira